Sunrise Glacier could mean:

 Sunrise Glacier (Alaska), a glacier of the Alaska Range
 Sunrise Glacier (Montana), a glacier of the Mission Mountains of Montana